A population centre, in Canadian census data, is a populated place, or a cluster of interrelated populated places, which meet the demographic characteristics of an urban area. A population centre has a population of at least 1,000 and a population density of no fewer than 400 people per square kilometre.

Population centres are not the same thing as urban municipalities. For example, the city of St. Albert is legally separate from Edmonton, but they are part of the same population centre.

The term was first introduced in the Canada 2011 Census; prior to that, Statistics Canada used the term urban area.

As of the 2006 Census of Canada, the Province of Alberta had 107 urban areas with a cumulative population of 2,699,851 and an average population of 25,232. In the 2011 census, Statistics Canada listed 109 population centres in the province. This number increased to 122 in the Canada 2016 Census.

List 
The below table is a list of those population centres in Alberta from the 2021 Census of Population as designated, named, and delineated by Statistics Canada.

Retired population centres 
The following is a list of communities were once designated as population centres by Statistics Canada, but were retired after their populations dropped below 1,000 people. Some of them have since surpassed the minimum population threshold of 1,000 yet have not been reintroduced as population centres.
Smoky Lake (retired after 2016)
Spirit River (retired after 2016)

Retired urban areas 
The following is a list of communities were once designated as urban areas by Statistics Canada, but were retired after their populations dropped below 1,000 people. Some of them have since surpassed the minimum population threshold of 1,000 yet have not been reintroduced as population centres.
Bellevue (retired after 1991 census)
Castor (retired after 1991)
Coronation (retired after 1991)
Lake Louise (retired after 2001 census)
McLennan (retired after 1986)

See also 
List of the largest population centres in Canada
List of census agglomerations in Alberta
List of census divisions of Alberta
List of cities in Alberta
List of communities in Alberta
List of designated places in Alberta
List of hamlets in Alberta
List of municipalities in Alberta
List of towns in Alberta
List of villages in Alberta

References 

Population centres